Monika Lewczuk (born 10 June 1988) is a Polish singer, songwriter and former model.

Career

Early career
At the beginning of her career, she worked as a model. She took part in many beauty contests, such as Miss Polski 2009 Miss Globe International 2009, and winning Miss Supranational 2011.

2014–present
In 2014, she participated in the fifth season of The Voice of Poland, being a member of Team Marek Piekarczyk. She was dropped in the Battle rounds. Soon after, she signed to Universal Music.

In July 2015, her debut single, "#Tam tam", was released. The song was certified gold by the Polish Society of the Phonographic Industry (ZPAV). Her second single, "Zabiorę cię stąd", was released in second half of the same year and peaked at number eleven on the Polish Airplay Chart.

Her debut studio album #1 was released in June 2016 and was certified gold in Poland by the ZPAV. The singer co-wrote the album with the likes of Rafał Malicki and Sarsa. In the same time, the album's third single, "Ty i Ja", was released. The single reached number three on the Polish Airplay Chart and received a triple platinum certification from the ZPAV. In the summer, artist was nominated for Best Radio Debut at the Eska Music Awards. In the second half of the 2016, she collaborated with Spanish singer Álvaro Soler, recording a song "Libre", which topped the chart in Poland.

Discography

Studio albums

EPs

Singles

As lead artist

As featured artist

Awards and nominations

References

External links 
 

1988 births
Living people
Miss Supranational winners
Polish pop singers
Polish female models
People from Łomża
21st-century Polish singers
21st-century Polish women singers